Filip Delaveris (born 10 December 2000) is a Norwegian professional footballer who plays as a left winger for Norwegian side KFUM Oslo, on loan from Brann.

References

External links

2000 births
Living people
Norwegian footballers
Norwegian expatriate footballers
Norway youth international footballers
Association football wingers
Lyn Fotball players
Odds BK players
SBV Vitesse players
Eliteserien players
Norwegian expatriate sportspeople in the Netherlands
Expatriate footballers in the Netherlands
Footballers from Oslo